Lev Tolstoy and the Russia of Nicholas II is a 1928 Soviet silent documentary film directed by Esfir Shub. The film is considered lost.

See also
 Leo Tolstoy
 Nicholas II of Russia

References

Bibliography 
 Christie, Ian & Taylor, Richard. The Film Factory: Russian and Soviet Cinema in Documents 1896-1939. Routledge, 2012.

External links 
 

Lost Russian films
Soviet silent films
1920s Russian-language films
Soviet black-and-white films
1928 films
1928 documentary films
Leo Tolstoy
Nicholas II of Russia
1928 lost films
Lost Soviet films
Russian black-and-white films
Black-and-white documentary films